Jenny Davis (born 1983 or 1984) is a Scottish racing cyclist from East Calder, West Lothian.

Davis is a Commonwealth Games silver medallist, coming second in the  Women’s Team Sprint in the Delhi 2010 Games.

See also
City of Edinburgh Racing Club
Achievements of members of City of Edinburgh Racing Club

References

1980s births
Living people
Scottish female cyclists
Sportspeople from West Lothian
Cyclists at the 2010 Commonwealth Games
Commonwealth Games silver medallists for Scotland
Commonwealth Games medallists in cycling
Medallists at the 2010 Commonwealth Games